Clarens-Montreux or Clarens is a neighborhood in the municipality of Montreux, in the canton of Vaud, in Switzerland. This neighborhood is the biggest and most populated of the city of Montreux.

Clarens was made famous throughout Europe by the immense success of the book La Nouvelle Héloïse by Jean-Jacques Rousseau.

Notable people 

 Lived in Clarens
 Élisée Reclus (1830–1905), renowned French geographer, writer and anarchist; resided in Clarens from 1872
 Pyotr Ilyich Tchaikovsky (1840–1893), the Russian composer of the Romantic period, wrote his Violin Concerto in Clarens in 1878; it is one of the best known violin concertos ever written.
 Igor Stravinsky (1882–1971), the Russian composer, lived in Clarens during the summers of 1910 to 1915. He composed his ballets The Rite of Spring and Pulcinella here.
 Sholem Aleichem (1859–1916), the Yiddish classic writer, resided in Clarens in 1912.

 Died in Clarens
 David Urquhart (1805–1877), Scottish diplomat, writer and politician, MP for Stafford 1847 to 1852, introduced the Turkish bath to Britain; lived in Clarens from 1864 and is buried here.
 Paul Kruger (1825–1904), ex-President of the Transvaal Republic up to and including the Second Boer War, lived his final year in self-imposed exile in Clarens after escaping from South Africa, and died there. Clarens, Free State, a small town in South Africa, was named in his honor. 
 Johannes van Laar (1860–1938), Dutch chemist who is best known for the equations regarding chemical activity (Van Laar equation).

 Buried in Clarens
 Sydney Chaplin (1885–1965), English actor and the elder half-brother of Sir Charlie Chaplin. He died in Nice and was buried in Clarens.
 Oskar Kokoschka (1886–1980), Austrian artist, poet and playwright of expressionistic portraits and landscapes, lived in Montreux from 1947 to 1980, where he died. He is buried in Clarens.
 Vladimir Nabokov (1899–1977), Russian-born novelist, poet, translator and entomologist; in 1961 he and Véra moved from the United States to Montreux, where he subsequently died. He is buried in Clarens.

Education 

St George's School in Switzerland, a British international school, is in Clarens.

Photo gallery

References

External links

Rescue society on the Geneva Lake "Mon Devoir", section of Clarens

Villages in the canton of Vaud
Populated places on Lake Geneva